The 2005 northern Peru earthquake occurred on September 25 at 20:56 local time (September 26 01:56 UTC) with a magnitude of 7.5. It resulted in the deaths of at least 20 people.

Earthquake

Impact
At least 20 people died, 266 others were injured and 39,000 residents were displaced. Damage and power outages occurred in Iquitos, Cajamarca, Chiclayo, Chimbote, Huacho, Tumbes, Sullana, Piura and Pucallpa.

See also
 List of earthquakes in 2005
 List of earthquakes in Peru

References

External links
Strong earthquake strikes northern Peru (Pictures of damage)

Peru 2005
Earthquake
2005 Northern
2005 disasters in Peru